This is a list of Hindu temples and their remains in Indonesia. Indonesia has been part of Indosphere of Greater India where sanskritization and Hinduism spread across Indonesia. Hindus in Indonesia are a multi-ethnic society consisting of different Indonesian ethnicities, such as Balinese, Javanese, Indian and other ethnic groups. According to government statistics, the majority of Indonesian Hindus are Balinese that inhabit the island of Bali. This claim has been disputed by one of the leading Hindu bodies of the nation, the Parishada Hindu Dharma Indonesia (PHDI), which estimates there are about 18 million Hindus, indicating that most are not of Balinese origin. There is also a significant Indonesian Indian Hindu minority settled in large cities. Numbers of Indonesian natives that adhere to a form of native Austronesian ancestral and natural worship might also be categorized as Hindus, such as Dayak people  (Kaharingan), Batak Karo (Parmalim), Javanese (Kejawen) and, Baduy people (Sunda Wiwitan). Hindu Dayak and Kaharingan groups are concentrated in Central Kalimantan.

Types
The design, style, layout, architecture and decoration of Hindu temples differ among various ethnic groups. In general, Indonesian Hindu temples are based on the Vasusastra-Manasara, a Hindu text on architecture, though they have significant native and Chinese influence.
Balinese Hindu temples do not have the Gopuram above temples unlike Indian Tamil Hindu temples which feature a prominent Gopuram at the entrance. Indian temples are designed as indoor house of worship, while Balinese temples are designed as open-air temple within walled compound connected by series of intricately decorated roofed gates and split gates. In Indonesia, there are roughly three types of Hindu templesː
 Candi, the Javanese ancient Hindu temples
 Pura, the Balinese temples
 Kuil or mandir, the Indian Hindu temples

Candi

Candi is an Indonesian term to refer to ancient temples, the word originated from the Sanskrit word Candikargha which is associated with the Goddess Durga. Prior to the rise of Islam, between the 5th to 15th century Dharmic faiths (Hinduism and Buddhism) were the majority in Indonesian archipelago, especially in Java and Sumatra. As the result numerous Hindu temples, locally known as candi, constructed and dominated the landscape of Java. According to local beliefs, Java had thousands of Hindu temples which co-existed with Buddhist temples, most of which were buried in massive eruption of Mount Merapi in 1006 AD.

Between 1100 and 1500 additional Hindu temples were built, but abandoned by Hindus and Buddhists as Islam spread in Java circa 15th to 16th century.

In last 200 years, some of these have been rediscovered mostly by farmers while preparing their lands for crops. Most of these ancient temples were rediscovered and reconstructed between 19th to 20th century, and treated as the important archaeological findings and also as tourist attraction, worship is mainly done on the national days by Balinese and local Hindu and Buddhist on sacred days such as Nyepi  and Waisak In Indonesia. The local population mostly has converted to Islam or Christianity, but there are still also many worshipers who follow Kejawèn. Today, these ancient Hindu temples in Java are under the authority of Dinas Purbakala (Archaeological Authority) under the Ministry of Culture.

Majority of Hindu temples in Java were dedicated to Shiva, who Javanese Hindus considered as the God who commands the energy to destroy, recombine and recreate the cycle of life. Small temples were often dedicated to Shiva and his family (wife Durga, son Ganesha). Larger temple complexes include temples for Vishnu and Brahma, but the most majestic, sophisticated and central temple was dedicated to Shiva. The 732 AD Canggal inscription found in Southern Central Java, written in Indonesian Sanskrit script, eulogizes Shiva, calling him God par-excellence. Historical scripts suggest Javanese recognized amongst themselves three sects of Shiva - Mahesvara, Buddhist (Saugata) and Mahabrahmana (Rsi). The Hindu and Buddhist temples co-existed, people intermarried, with occasional couple featuring a Hindu king and Buddhist wife as evidenced by Candi Plaosan, the husband and wife maintaining their different religious beliefs after marriage. Most of the temples are laid out in perfect squares, with secondary temples or lingas arranged geometrically or circularly. However, midst of the perfect symmetries, is present a shift of the temple complex axis and primary statue enclosure axis; this asymmetry is believed to be deliberate because the shift is always to the north and the ratio of asymmetry is exactly the same in a dozen temples where this has been measured. Some of sculptures and reliefs in the temples represent Hindu dance forms, currently seen in India but not in Java. Some in temples Java have a mix of Hindu and Buddhist features which has made attribution and original purpose against later usage difficult to ascertain.

Central Java
Central Java region consist of modern Central Java and Yogyakarta provinces. Most of Hindu temples in Cantral Java region are candi or ancient temples built between 8th to 15th century. Some known Hindu temples in Java include:

 Candi Prambanan - the largest Hindu temples complex uncovered so far in Indonesia; it is also known as Loro Jonggrang, and it includes 240 temples; the three central temples have intricate carvings on its walls to pictorially describe all major events from the Hindu epic Ramayana. The temple is still used by local Hindu minority community as a place of worship on their special days of the year.
 Candi Ijo
 Candi Barong
 Candi Sambisari - located in village of Purwomartani (Kalasan), this temple is located below ground level, and is a perfect square of 13.65 x 13.65 meters and is 7 meters high; it is the most preserved and complete Hindu temple in Java from the late 9th century AD. The large linga and yoni inside the temple is made of andesite stone; the temple faces west and the yoni inside the temple faces north. The reliefs in the wall are well preserved and intricate. The temple is surrounded by a grid of 8 lingas in a precise symmetric arrangement. There is evidence that nearby farm fields are on top of walls and parts of this temple yet to be unearthed. 
 Candi Kedulan
 Candi Gebang
 Candi Kimpulan
 Candi Gedong Songo - built in the early 8th century, on southern slopes of Gunung Ungaran overlooking central Java, by Wangsa Sanjaya dynasty
 Candi Pringapus situated in Temanggung
 Candi Losari situated in Magelang
 Candi Selogriyo - built in the 8th century, on slopes of Mount Sumbing overlooking rice terraces of Java
 Candi Gunung Wukir - built before 732 AD, dedicated to God Siwa, famous for the  inscription discovered in one of its wells of secondary temple. It is located in Semin village (Salam). The temple's center still has yoni, but the linga is missing.
 Candi Morangan - built in the 9th century CE, with Siva's linga-yoni, has delicate carvings of tangled lovers and vegetation motifs on andesite stones; the temple is sometimes called fragrance-exuding temple
 Candi Gunung Sari - located in village of Gulon (Muntilan), this is a Siva temple with barong relief suggesting a syncretic fusion of Hindu and pre-Hindu Javanese ideas
 Candi Merak - a 10th-century Hindu temple, located east of Jogjakarta, like many other temples in Java has one main temple and three secondary temples with gupolo; the wall is carved with reliefs of Siwa's wife Durga, turtle, flowers and birds.
 Candi Dieng
 Candi Sukuh
 Candi Cetho

Eastern Java
 Candi Penataran
 Candi Jawi
 Candi Kidal
 Candi Singhasari
 Candi Surawana
Candi Jago
Candi Bajang Ratu
Candi Macan Putih

Western Java
 Candi Cangkuang
 Candi Bojongmenje

Banten
Lebak Cibedug, West Citorek

Bali
 Candi Gunung Kawi
 Candi Tebing Kerobokan
 Goa Garba
 Candi Tebing Kelebutan
 Goa Gajah
 Candi Tebing Tegallinggah
 Candi Tebing Jukut Paku
 Relief Yeh Pulu

Pura

Pura is Balinese Hindu temples. Balinese Hinduism is the continuation of Javanese Hindu Dharmic tradition developed in Java between the 8th to 15th century. After Islam toppled Hinduism in Java circa 15th century, the remnants of this ancient Indonesian Hinduism are confined in Bali. Balinese Hinduism incorporate native Austronesian and Hindu worship of ancestors batara-s in Balinese from Sanskrit pitr-s) next to the general ideas from Hinduism of Vedic deities, terms and rituals imported from India. In Bali, a Pura (Balinese temple) is designed as an open-air worship place within a walled compound. The compound walls have a series of intricately decorated gates without doors for the devotee to enter. The design, plan and layout of the holy pura follows a square layout.

Today, Balinese Hindus are concentrated in Bali island and some other cities in Indonesia. In Bali, Hindu Balinese temples (Pura) can be found quite easily, since they are the majority in the island. Outside Bali, they can be found too but not too many, for mostly these temples were followed the migration and only to accommodate Balinese people outside Bali, such as Balinese temples in Greater Jakarta.

Bali

 Pura Besakih, Karangasem Regency (the largest Balinese Hindu temple in Indonesia)
 Pura Ulun Danu Bratan
 Pura Luhur Ulu Watu 
 Pura Kehen, southern slope of Bangli hill
 Pura Makori, Bali
 Pura Ulun Danu Batur, Karanganyar Batur village, Kintamani
 Pura Watukaru, Wangaya Gede village, Tabanan 
 Pura Puncak Penulisan, Kintamani
 Pura Pancering Jagat, Trunyan village, Kintamani
 Pura Jagadnatha, Jalan Mayor Wisnu, Puputan Square

 Pura Maospahit Denpasar, Banjar Gerenceng
 Pura Tanah Lot, Marga
 Pura Goa Lawah
 Pura Tirtha Empul
 Pura Sakenan, Klungkung Regency
 Pura Taman Ayun
 Pura Taman Saraswati, Ubud
 Pura Pengerebongan, Kesiman, Denpasar
 Pura Bolo, Tegallalang, Gianyar
 Pura Khayangan Jagat Masceti, Medahan Keramas, Gianyar
 Pura Penataran Sasih, Pejeng village, Gianyar
Pura Griya Sakti Manuaba

Nusa Tenggara

 Pura Lingsar, Narmada, Lombok, West Nusa Tenggara
 Pura Watugunung, Bima, West Nusa Tenggara
 Pura Agung Girinatha, Sumbawa Besar, West Nusa Tenggara
 Pura Agung Waidoko, Maumere, East Nusa Tenggara

 Pura Agung Giri Kertabhuana, Kupang, East Nusa Tenggara
 Pura Agung Oebanantha, Kupang, East Nusa Tenggara
 Pura Dalem Kahyangan Wolowona, Ende, East Nusa Tenggara
 Pura Atambuanantha, Atambua, East Nusa Tenggara

Eastern Java
 Pura Agung Jagat Karana, Surabaya
 Pura Tirta Wening, Tambak Sari, Surabaya
 Pura Ranu Ngudisari, Tlagan hamlet, Pohjejer village, Gondang subdistrict, Mojokerto Regency
 Pura Luhur Poten, Mount Bromo, Probolinggo Regency

Central Java
 Pura Agung Giri Natha, Jalan Sumbing No. 12, Semarang
 Pura Wira Buwana, Jalan Jendral Sarwo Edi Wibowo, Kompleks Akademi Militer, Magelang
 Pura Jagatnatha, Banguntapan (Janti), Yogyakarta
 Pura Bhakti Widhi, Jalan Ngawen, Km. 2.5, Beji, Ngawen, Gunung Kidul
 Pura Pita Maha, Karanganom, Klaten Utara, Klaten
 Pura Indra Prasta, Mutihan, Sondakan, Lawean, Surakarta
 Pura Caraka Dewa, Marga Padang, Tarub, Tegal.
 Pura Segara Suci, Panggung, Tegal.

Western Java

 Pura Parahyangan Agung Jagatkarta, Taman Sari, Bogor Regency - the second largest Balinese Hindu temple in Indonesia.
 Pura Giri Kusuma, Bogor
 Pura Penataran Agung Sangga Bhuwana, Karawang
 Pura Agung Wira Loka Natha, Cimahi
 Pura Wira Satya Dharma, Ujung Berung Bandung
 Pura Satya Akasa, Margahayu, Bandung
 Pura Agung Jati Pramana, Cirebon

Banten
Pura Eka Wira Anantha Taman, Serang
Pura Aditya Dharmesti, Tangerang
Pura Dharma Sidhi, Tangerang
Pura Parahyangan Jagat Guru, Tangerang
Padmasana Agung Bhuana Angkasa

Northern Sumatra
 Pura Agung Raksa Bhuana, Jalan Polonia 216, Medan
 Pura Jagadhita Toba, Jalan Toba 21118, Pematang Siantar

Southern Sumatra
 Pura Penataran Agung Sriwijaya, Jalan Seduduk Putih No.19, Kecamatan Ilir Timur II, Palembang

Kuil

Kovil or koil (kuil in Indonesian) are used to refer Indian Hindu temples. Because of the influx of Indian immigrants into Indonesia back in the 19th century, there are numbers of Indian-style temples erected in Indonesian cities, especially in Medan and Jakarta. The Indian Hindu temples in Indonesia followed closely the design, style, layout and architecture commonly found in India and neighboring Malaysia and Singapore. Tamil Hindus are most concentrated in Medan, North Sumatra. There are around 40 Hindu temples in Medan and nearby but only a few Balinese Hindu temples in North Sumatra. Balaji Venkateshvara Temple (Pasar IV Padang Bulan, Medan) is developed by Tamil, Telugu, and Malayalam groups. Punjabis are mostly Sikh and Hindu. Most of them mixed these religions and some of them can speak Punjabi. Hindi and Sindhi are concentrated in Jakarta and usually open textile and garment business. There are around 12 Gurudvaras in Indonesia.

Northern Sumatra

 Shri Sithi Vinayagar Kovil, Karang Sari, Polonia Medan
 Shri Balaji Venkateshwara Kovil, Jln.Bunga Wijaya Kesuma/Pasar IV, Padang Bulan, Medan
 Sri Mariamman Temple, Jalan Teuku Umar, Kampung Madras, Medan
 Thandayuthapani Temple, Medan
 Shri Kaliamman Kovil, Jalan Zainul Arifin, Medan
 Maha Muniswarar Kovil, Medan
 Arulmigu Shri Maha Mariamman Kovil, Sampali
 Shri Thendayudhabani Kovil, Jln.Sultan Hasanuddin, Lubuk Pakam
 Shri Subramaniam Nagarattar kovil (Chettiar Kuil), Jalan Kejaksaan, Kebun Bunga, Medan

 Shri Maha Shiva Shakti Kovill, Karang Sari, Medan
 Shri Mariamman Kovil, Medan Helvetia
 Shri Singgama Kali Kovil, Jalan Karya, Medan Barat
 Shri Kaliamman Kovil, Jalan Karya, Medan Barat - right next to Vihara Manggala
 Shri Mariamman Kovil, Bekala, Medan Simalingkar B
 Shri Rajarajeshvari Amman Kovil, Selesai, Binjai Barat
 Shri Karrupa Veera Vigneswara Kovil Jalan Starban No.86 Medan Polonia
 Shri Hanuman Kovil Jl.Teratai Ujung Karang Sari Polonia Medan
 Shree Murugan Temple, Jalan Hamka, Kisaran, Asahan
 Shri Thendayuthabani Kovil, Lubuk Pakam, Deli Serdang
 Shri Singgama Kali Koil, Jl Prof M Yamin, Tebing Tinggi

Greater Jakarta
 Sri Siva Temple, Pluit, North Jakarta
 Shri Bathra Kaliamman Kovil, Komplek Perumahan Puri Metropolitan, Jalan Krisan Asri V, Blok B3, No. 20-22, Gondrong Petir, Cipondoh - Tangerang
 Ambe Mata Kovil, build by Indian, Graha Essar steel, BFI Estate Industri 3 Area Kav.#B1, Cibitung, Bekasi - 17520
 Jai Kalimaa Kovil, Jalan Agung Barat 35 Blok B/36 no. 13 Sunter, Jakarta
 Shri Sanathana Dharma Aalayam - Murugan Kovil (under construction), Jakarta

Banda Aceh

 Kuil Palani Andawer, Kampung Kedah, Kutaraja, Banda Aceh

Indonesian Hindu Temples outside the country
Compared to Indian Hindu temples, there are relatively few Hindu temples of Indonesian architecture outside the country.  They are as follows:
 Pura Girinatha, Dili, East Timor
 Pura Tri Hita Karana (located in Erholungspark Marzahn, Berlin, Germany)
 A padmasana exists in Hamburg, Germany in front of the Museum of Ethnology, Hamburg.
 Two Balinese Temples exist in the Pairi Daiza botanical garden in Belgium.

See also

 Buddhism in Southeast Asia
 Candi of Indonesia
 Hinduism in Java
 Hinduism in Southeast Asia
 Indonesian Esoteric Buddhism
 Indosphere
 List of Buddhist temples
 Lists of Hindu temples by country

References

Indonesia
Hindu temples
List